German recording artist Joy Denalane has released five studio albums, two live albums, and 17 singles, plus six singles as a featured artist. Denalane scored her first chart entry in 1999, when she was featured on hip hop group Freundeskreis's single "Mit dir", a duet with future husband Max Herre, that became a top ten hit in Germany. Its success led to a recording deal with the Four Music label, which released her debut album Mamani in 2001. A soul album with elements of neo soul, jazz, and afro pop, it reached number eight on the German Albums Chart and earned a gold certification from the Bundesverband Musikindustrie (BVMI). It produced five singles and spawned the live album Mamani Live, which was released in 2004.

Following a longer hiatus in which she recorded collaborations with others musicians such as Herre, Afrob, and Common, Denalane released her second album Born & Raised in 2006. A breakaway form her previous album, it was entirely recorded in English language and took Denalane's work further into the rhythm and blues and hip hop genres. Upon its released, it debuted at number two in Germany and at number five on the Swiss Albums Chart. Both, the album and its lead single "Let Go", the latter of which entered the top thirty on the German Singles Chart, remain her highest-charting solo releases to date.

Maureen, Denalane's third studio album, was released in 2011. The album reached the top ten and top twenty in Germany and Switzerland respectively, but failed to produce a charting single. In 2014, she became part of the German Band Aid 30 project; their rendition of which "Do They Know It's Christmas?" reached number-one on the German Singles Chart. In 2015, she released "Keine Religion", the theme song of the romantic comedy Traumfrauen (2015) as a single.

Albums

Studio albums

Live albums

Singles

As a main artist

As a featured artist

Album appearances

References

External links

 JoyDenalane.com — official site

Discographies of German artists
Rhythm and blues discographies
Folk music discographies